Colebrook Township is one of the twenty-seven townships of Ashtabula County, Ohio, United States. The 2010 census found 994 people in the township.

Geography
Located on the southern edge of the county, it borders the following townships:
New Lyme Township - north
Cherry Valley Township - northeast corner
Wayne Township - east
Gustavus Township, Trumbull County - southeast corner
Greene Township, Trumbull County - south
Bloomfield Township, Trumbull County - southwest corner
Orwell Township - west
Rome Township - northwest corner

No municipalities are located in Colebrook Township.

Name and history
It is the only Colebrook Township statewide.

The first settler in the township was Joel Blakeslee, who arrived from New York in 1819.

Government
The township is governed by a three-member board of trustees, who are elected in November of odd-numbered years to a four-year term beginning on the following January 1. Two are elected in the year after the presidential election and one is elected in the year before it. There is also an elected township fiscal officer, who serves a four-year term beginning on April 1 of the year after the election, which is held in November of the year before the presidential election. Vacancies in the fiscal officership or on the board of trustees are filled by the remaining trustees.  Currently, the board is composed of chairman James Vins, Jr. and members Ron Chutas and Joseph Yuhasz.

References

External links
County website

Townships in Ashtabula County, Ohio
Townships in Ohio